Peter Lee (born November 30, 1960) is an American computer scientist. He is Corporate Vice President and head of Microsoft Research. Previously, he was  the head of the Transformational Convergence Technology Office of the Defense Advanced Research Projects Agency and the chair of the Computer Science Department at Carnegie Mellon University. His research focuses on software security and reliability.

Lee received his PhD degree from the University of Michigan in May 1987 with thesis titled The automatic generation of realistic compilers from high-level semantic descriptions. He is a Fellow of the Association for Computing Machinery.

Career
Microsoft Research was founded in 1991.
 
A longtime "Microsoft Researcher," Peter Lee became the organization's head in 2013. In 2014, the organization had 1,100 advanced researchers "working in 55 areas of study in a dozen labs worldwide."  From 2015 to 2020, Lee was the head of Microsoft Research NExT (for New Experiences and Technologies) and Microsoft Healthcare.   Since 2020 he leads the combined MSR Labs, AI, NExT, Healthcare, and other incubation efforts.

Students 
 Greg Morrisett
 Scott Draves
 George Necula

References

External links 
 Microsoft.com: Peter Lee research information
 CMU.edu: Peter Lee webpage
 CMU.edu:  CMU curriculum vitae for Peter Lee 

American computer scientists
Software engineering researchers
1960 births
Living people
Fellows of the Association for Computing Machinery
Microsoft employees
University of Michigan alumni
Carnegie Mellon University faculty
Scientists from Michigan
20th-century American engineers
21st-century American engineers